Timet or variation, may refer to:

 timidity, fear
 time-t, a common name for a value or variable representing time
 time_t, a C computer language datatype for storing time values
 Titanium Metals Corporation (TIMET)
 Timet (song) 1970 tune by Dizzy Gillespie off the album Portrait of Jenny
 Timet the Flying Squirrel (video game), former name of the 1994 game Mr. Nutz: Hoppin' Mad
 Timet, the would-be protagonist of the 1994 video game Mr. Nutz: Hoppin' Mad

See also

 
 Quia timet
 Time (disambiguation)